Sphingobacterium siyangense is a Gram-negative, non-spore-forming and non-motile bacterium from the genus of Sphingobacterium which has been isolated from soil from Jiangsu in China.

References

External links
Type strain of Sphingobacterium siyangense at BacDive -  the Bacterial Diversity Metadatabase

Sphingobacteriia
Bacteria described in 2008